George Henry Sharp (born 20 July 1935) is an English former amateur footballer who played as an outside left in the Football League for Darlington and Oldham Athletic. He stood in for Tommy Moran in three Fourth Division matches early in Darlington's 1957–58 season; his debut, on 31 August 1957, was in a 5–0 defeat away to Scunthorpe United. He moved on to Oldham later that season, and appeared once in the League.

He was born in Bedlington, Northumberland.

References

1935 births
Living people
People from Bedlington
Footballers from Northumberland
English footballers
Association football wingers
Darlington F.C. players
Oldham Athletic A.F.C. players
English Football League players